Ken Marcus (born October 2, 1946) is a famous American photographer, best known for his work in glamour and pornographic photography with Penthouse and Playboy magazines and for his own website.  For over 40 years he has produced hundreds of centerfolds, editorials, album covers, and advertisements. For many years, Marcus has lectured and conducted professional workshops in the US and internationally.

Early life and education 
Marcus's formal fine-art photographic training began at age 12. He studied with famed landscape photographer, Ansel Adams in Yosemite National Park for 13 years as well as with Brett Weston, Paul Caponigro, Wyn Bullock, Imogen Cunningham and Judy Dater, all of whom influenced his early work.

Ken Marcus attended the ArtCenter College of Design studying fashion and advertising photography. He later attended the Brooks Institute. At age 18, he opened his studio on Melrose Avenue in Hollywood, Los Angeles, where he continued to work for the next 53 years.

Career
In 1965, Marcus established his studio on Melrose Avenue in Hollywood. His earliest commercial work consisted of product shots, catalogs, and corporate and editorial assignments.

Throughout his 20s, Ken's commercial assignments included product and fashion catalogs, architectural interiors, food illustration, magazine editorials and advertising photography. Within five years of opening his studio, his work received national publicity and several Art Directors Club awards.

By the early '70s Marcus shot regularly for Max Factor, Frederick's of Hollywood, and other West Coast fashion clients. He also photographed musicians for album covers and posters, including the inside gatefold of George Harrison's Living in the Material World.

Glamour photography

In 1971 Marcus became the first American photographer for Penthouse magazine. His early pictorials involved couples and models photographed through heavy, soft focus diffusion. This technique, while popular during the early part of the 20th century, had not been used in publication since the early 1920s. Marcus crafted his own homemade diffusion filters because, at that time, there were none available on the commercial market.

In 1974, Marcus left Penthouse to become the West Coast Contributing Photographer at Playboy magazine. For 11 years Marcus's work was featured regularly in Playboy's 15 international editions, and for eight of those years Marcus exclusively photographed the Playboy Calendar. Between 1974 and 1985 he produced 41 Playmate layouts, over 100 calendars, covers and editorials and twice received Playboy's 'Photographer of the Year Award'.

Shortly thereafter, Marcus began shooting pictorials and centerfolds once again for Penthouse. New clients at this time included Jordache, Snap-on Tools, NAPA, and Muscle & Fitness magazine.

Fine-art photography 

Originally interested only in landscape fine-art photography, Ken began taking serious interest in nude photography as art during the time that he was working with Playboy.

In the early 80s, his nude studies of dancers with the Los Angeles Ballet were first exhibited in Los Angeles.

In 1988 Marcus was selected as the Artist-In-Residence at the Yosemite National Park Museum. His images of nude models in nature were originally banned by park officials, but are now shown as part of the museum's permanent collection.

Throughout his career, Marcus has done black and white portraits of celebrities such as Kareem Abdul-Jabbar, Virginia Madsen, Fabio, Vincent Price, Pam Anderson, and Tom Arnold.

Monterey Pop Festival discovery 
Marcus was one of only two official photographers at the 1967 Monterey Pop Festival. The images of Jimi Hendrix, Janis Joplin, The Who, Simon & Garfunkel, and Brian Jones of the Rolling Stones were rediscovered in 2005 during a studio remodel.

His photograph of Jimi Hendrix is featured on the Jimi Hendrix album, The Jimi Hendrix Experience: Live at Monterey, released on October 16, 2007.

Appearances and pop culture references 

Ken Marcus appeared in the opening scenes of the Baywatch TV movie Panic at Malibu Pier. His character is a photographer shooting a glamour layout that featured nudity on the beach.

In the comic book series Rocketeer, artist Dave Stevens portrayed Ken as the nefarious Marco of Hollywood with a readily identifiable caricature.

Books 
Contemporary American Erotic Photography: Volume 1 (1984) (Contributing Photographer)
California Club (1996)
Two Faces (1996)
Two Knotty Boys: Back on the Ropes (2009)

Awards 
1973 "Award of Distinctive Merit" at the Art Directors Club Annual Awards
1980 "Editorial Award for Photography" by Playboy Magazine
1981 "Editorial Award for Photography" by Playboy Magazine
1992 "Best Photography - Studio" at the Academy of Bodybuilding and Fitness Awards
2001 "Publisher's Choice Award" by Adult Stars Magazine
2010 "Best Bondage Photographer" by The Bondage Awards

References

External links 
 Ken Marcus' erotica site
 Ken Marcus Gallery.com, print sale site
 Ken Marcus' old 1996 portfolio site

1946 births
BDSM photographers
Bondage artists
Living people
Penthouse (magazine) people
Playboy photographers
Yosemite National Park
Fetish artists
Fetish photographers
American erotic photographers